Lascelina pitilla is a species of snout moth in the genus Lascelina. It was described by Herbert H. Neunzig and Maria Alma Solis in 2002 and is known from Costa Rica.

References

Moths described in 2002
Phycitinae